The Doomsday Scenario is the collective name of a series of Judge Dredd comic stories published in 2000 AD (progs 1141-1164) and the Judge Dredd Megazine (vol. 3 #52-59) in 1999. Written by John Wagner, it was the third such crossover story between those two publications, but was the first in which it was possible to read a complete and coherent tale by reading only those episodes which appeared in one comic or the other without having to buy both magazines. It was reprinted as two trade paperbacks, each collecting the episodes from one comic. When first published it was the longest Judge Dredd story arc ever told, at a total of 32 episodes and 279 pages, as well as several prequels and epilogues. The story tells of the Second Robot War in the year 2121, but its epilogues wrapped up two story arcs that had been developing for several years: former judge Galen DeMarco's unrequited love for Judge Dredd, and Dredd's bitter rivalry with Judge Edgar. The story is also notable for leading to the promotion of Judge Hershey, Dredd's sidekick and one of the strip's longest-running supporting characters, to the office of chief judge.

This was the last Judge Dredd story to exceed 20 episodes until "Origins" in 2006.

Plot

Back-story and supporting characters
The opening chapters of the story focus primarily on two characters that had appeared in previous stories: the villain Orlok the Assassin (in 2000 AD) and former judge Galen DeMarco (in the Megazine).

DeMarco was formerly a colleague of Dredd until she resigned from the Justice Department after being disciplined for kissing him, in breach of regulations (romantic liaisons between judges being prohibited). Dredd soon discovered that Judge Edgar had been responsible for uncovering her transgression, and had secretly orchestrated DeMarco's punishment as a way of revenging herself on Dredd in pursuance of a grudge.

After Judge Death, Orlok is arguably Judge Dredd's second most deadly archenemy, being responsible for numerous terrorist attacks on Dredd's city (such as spreading the Block Mania virus). A former judge of East-Meg One, his hatred of Dredd for bringing about the destruction of his home city in the Apocalypse War had not diminished nearly two decades later. However Dredd's colleague Judge Anderson believes him to have rehabilitated somewhat, and allowed him to go free on the last occasion they met.

However Nero Narcos is the main villain of the story, although not prominent until its last few episodes. Already introduced in earlier stories, he is the leader of the notorious Frendz Mob, the most powerful criminal organisation in Mega-City One. Having been badly injured in a gangland assassination attempt, his brain has been transplanted into an armoured robot body. Unknown to the judges, the Frendz Mob has sabotaged their new improved Mark II Lawgiver firearms, with which the street judges are already being issued.

Early episodes
Orlok is a fugitive on a distant planet, where he learns that a ten billion credit reward for the killing or kidnapping of Judge Dredd has been advertised by the Government-in-exile of East-Meg One, a band of ex-diplomats and others who survived the thermonuclear destruction of that city by Dredd's hand in 2104. Although not interested in the reward, he considers it unfitting that Dredd should be killed by anyone but himself, and heads for Earth. Arriving in Mega-City One, he is detected by Anderson, who tries to dissuade him from killing Dredd. Too late, she realises that Orlok has not changed as much as she thought, and she tries to arrest him, but Orlok overcomes her and takes her prisoner.

Meanwhile, DeMarco is trying to cope with adjusting to civilian life. Although Dredd is uninterested in her romantically, he retains an interest in her welfare, and he helps her to find a job as a licensed private detective. Her first assignment appears to be a missing person case, but it actually transpires that her client is working for the Frendz Mob, and is using her to locate a man who they wish to kill. DeMarco manages to find their intended victim and save his life, and she calls Dredd to interrogate him. The man reports that he works in a warehouse in which the Judges' new Lawgiver handguns are kept before being shipped to the Justice Department to replace the old models. He has been bribed to allow the Frendz Mob to exchange the microchips in the weapons with new ones, but does not know why.

Dredd investigates the warehouse, but before he has time to warn anyone about the sabotage, Nero Narcos begins his "Operation Doomsday," which turns out to be an all-out assault on the Judges of Mega-City One, in order to overthrow them and seize control of the city-state for himself. Although Dredd and DeMarco's discovery of his actions has forced Narcos to begin his coup early, it is nevertheless successful, since most of the judges have already been issued with the sabotaged Lawgivers. Legitimate Lawgivers have a safety feature which consists of a sensor in the grip which can detect the palm print of the user, and an explosive charge, so that if an unauthorised user attempts to fire one, it will explode in his hand. On the transmission of a radio signal by Narcos, however, all of the sabotaged Lawgivers are programmed to explode if fired by a judge, resulting in hundreds of judges across the city being killed or crippled before they realise what has happened. At the same time, Narcos dispatches thousands of "Assassinator"-class robots from hiding-places citywide to attack the judges everywhere simultaneously. Surprised and hampered by the sabotage of their weapons, the Judges are soon in disarray.

Dredd and some other judges with him are besieged in the warehouse, but manage to survive and defeat the robots sent against them, although DeMarco is knocked unconscious by an explosion, and the judges suffer heavy casualties. During the conflict, however, Orlok infiltrates the warehouse, kills a judge and steals his uniform. In Dredd's moment of victory against the robots, Orlok kills all of the judges except Dredd and the unconscious DeMarco, and kidnaps Dredd. Orlok flies Dredd and Anderson out of the city, leaving behind him a city which has become a warzone.

The trial of Judge Dredd
Orlok takes Dredd to the Government of East-Meg One, the Diktatorat, which is based on the Mediterranean Free State: a huge collection of ships docked together in a single compound in the Mediterranean Sea. As the Free State is an independent micronation, Mega-City One has never been able to take action against the Diktatorat before, despite the reward on Dredd's head. The Diktatorat announces that it intends to put Dredd on trial for genocide and war crimes for his role in the annihilation of East-Meg One seventeen years earlier; an action in which half a billion people lost their lives. The trial will be broadcast around the world on live television.

Orlok objects to this, insisting that no trial is necessary as Dredd's guilt is indisputable, but he is overruled, and to punish his insubordination he is ordered to act as Dredd's defence counsel. When the prosecution finishes their case, Orlok calls Dredd as a witness, but Dredd flatly refuses to participate, denouncing the trial as a farce. Unable to bring himself to speak on Dredd's behalf, Orlok simply rests his case.

At this point Anderson, who is no longer a prisoner and has been allowed to be present at the trial, objects, and the Diktatorat permits her to conduct Dredd's defence instead. She immediately calls Orlok as a witness and questions him about his own involvement in the Apocalypse War. Answering her questions truthfully, Orlok concedes that East-Meg One started the war by sending him to attack Mega-City One with the Block Mania virus, as well as launching the first missiles. He also accepts that, had a similar attack been launched against his own city, his response would have been similar to Dredd's.

Faced with this evidence, the Diktatorat retires to consider its verdict, and realises that in deference to world opinion they can no longer convict and execute Dredd with any credibility. Instead they plan to acquit Dredd, and arrange for a man whose family died in the war to shoot Dredd in a feigned fit of rage at the verdict. Discovering this plot, Orlok is outraged at the proposed deception, believing that Dredd should be convicted or released, without regard for the Diktatorat's public image. Orlok is further disillusioned with his masters when they confess that the ten billion credit reward on Dredd's head was secretly funded by Nero Narcos, to eliminate Dredd before Operation Doomsday began. Tired of Orlok's protests, the Diktatorat dismiss him from their service, whereupon Orlok assassinates most of them and rescues Dredd from his cell.

Orlok, Dredd and Anderson attempt to escape from the Free State, in the course of which Dredd sinks the main East-Meg vessel. Enraged by this, Orlok again turns on Dredd and they each try to kill each other. Their fight is interrupted when Dredd inadvertently throws Orlok into the sea, where he is attacked by East-Meg survivors. Anderson and Dredd leave him for dead and escape in a hijacked airship, which they fly to Brit-Cit. (However Orlok kills his attackers and escapes, to return in another story three years later.)

The Second Robot War
Meanwhile, in Mega-City One, DeMarco awakes to discover that Dredd is missing and that the Judges are losing the war. Everywhere Assassinator droids are killing judges and seizing Justice Department buildings. Most of the surviving judges are in hiding or waging a guerrilla war against the robots, rather than risk open combat, and Narcos has appeared on television to offer rewards to civilians who inform on the whereabouts of judges, and promises to execute anyone found harbouring a judge. DeMarco teams up with Judge Roffman, who works for Judge Edgar, and Judge White, who is badly wounded. Despite DeMarco's exasperation with Roffman's cowardice and inexperience, they manage to find refuge in the secret underground base where Chief Judge Volt is attempting to organise the resistance. However the war is going badly for the judges, since Narcos appears to have an inexhaustible supply of robots to take the place of those destroyed, and the judges are dying in droves. Already Narcos's robots have seized Mega-City One's military satellites which contain the city's nuclear arsenal. Narcos also has control of the Grand Hall of Justice and the Public Surveillance Unit, enabling him to monitor the whole city and deploy his forces more effectively.

Dredd arrives in Brit-Cit, where ostensibly the British judges refuse to help him. However this is a ruse, and they offer Dredd all possible assistance short of outright military assault on Narcos's forces. Dredd recruits a squad of American judges from Mega-City One's embassy in Brit-Cit, and they fly in a Brit-Cit Justice Department airship to the Cursed Earth desert outside Mega-City One. Brit-Cit has discovered that Narcos has four spaceships landed in the Cursed Earth, each containing thousands of Assassinator droids. Dredd's squad infiltrates one of them, seizes it and reprograms the robots on board to fight for them. Brit-Cit then destroys the other three ships, ending Narcos's supply of reinforcements at a stroke.

Without reinforcements, and under attack by Dredd's converted Assassinators, Narcos begins to suffer heavy casualties. The Judges take heart and fight back with renewed vigour, led by Deputy Chief Judge Hershey, and the tide begins to turn. Dredd and his squad return to the city to join the fight, and by the time Narcos recognises he is defeated, Dredd's robots have regained control of the city's nuclear weapons, and Narcos's Doomsday option is no longer open to him. Narcos is gunned down in the street by a dozen judges, and the Judges regain control of the city.

Conclusion
Dredd visits the chief judge's underground bunker, where Chief Judge Volt is still brooding over his own perceived shortcomings as a leader, blaming himself for failing to prevent the outbreak of war in the first place, and contemplating resignation or suicide. On his way to the chief judge's office, Dredd meets DeMarco in the bunker's medical wing, where he invites her to apply to rejoin Justice Department, as there will never be a better time. However she refuses, as she does not agree with the Department's mandatory code of celibacy. Dredd again tells her that there is no prospect of any romantic relationship between them, and with this further rejection of her, DeMarco's love for him finally dies.

Their conversation is interrupted by the sound of a gunshot from the chief judge's office. Racing to the scene, they discover that Volt has shot himself dead.

Epilogues
The Doomsday Scenario ended with the deaths of Narcos (in 2000 AD) and Volt (in the Megazine). However the story had important consequences in two short stories which followed closely afterwards (one of which was included in the trade paperback). In Volt Face, Hershey became acting chief judge and ordered that Volt's suicide should be covered up, to present the public with a more heroic death which was fabricated for him by doctoring video footage. This episode foreshadowed a plot device used in the story Origins seven years later, in which Chief Judge Fargo's suicide was also covered up and a heroic death in the line of duty was invented for him.

In The Cal Legacy, Hershey was elected permanent chief judge, and asked Judge Shenker to step down from the Council of Five as a result of his division's failure to give sufficient warning of the impending Second Robot War. The new chief judge also demoted Judge Edgar, effectively ending her ability to threaten Dredd and his associates.

The events of the war would also lead to the Banzai Battalion robots, their owners killed in the fighting, joining the Justice Department. Later still, the spectre of another robot war would lead to the Department trying to shut them down, and the Banzais fleeing.

Stories
All stories written by John Wagner.
All references to the Judge Dredd Megazine are to volume 3.

Prequels and prologues
The Doomsday Scenario was preceded by several stories which set up the back-story described above and introduced Narcos. See also The Pit, which introduced DeMarco and also featured the Frendz Mob.

"Bad Frendz" (art by Carlos Ezquerra, 2000 AD #955-959, 1995)
Introduced the Frendz Mob and Nero Narcos.
"Beyond the Call of Duty" (art by Carlos Ezquerra, 2000 AD #1101-1110, 1998)
Beginning of DeMarco's infatuation with Dredd. She kisses Dredd, for which she is later caught by Judge Edgar.
"Worst of Frendz" (art by Steve Tappin, in Judge Dredd Megazine #46, 1998)
Beginning of Doomsday Scenario build-up. Narcos moves his brain from a nutrient tank into a robot body.
"Gun Play" (art by Paolo Parente, in 2000 AD #1122, 1998)
First hint that Lawgiver handguns are being sabotaged by the Frendz Mob.
"The Scorpion Dance" (art by John Burns, in 2000 AD #1125-1132, 1998-1999)
DeMarco resigns from the force as a result of Edgar's machinations.
"The Contract" (art by Cam Kennedy, in Judge Dredd Megazine #50, 1999)
Introduces Assassinator droids, being field-tested by Narcos.

The Doomsday Scenario
All stories published in 1999.

In 2000 AD

"Return of the Assassin" (art by Cam Kennedy, #1141-1147)
"The Trial" (art by Simon Davis, #1148-1150)
"Trial of Strength" (art by Neil Googe and Stephen Baskerville (collaboration), #1151-1152)
"War Games" (art by Neil Googe, Mike McMahon, Charlie Adlard, Andy Clarke and Stephen Baskerville (collaboration), and Colin Wilson, #1153-1159)
"Endgame" (art by Charlie Adlard, # 1160-1164)

In Judge Dredd Megazine

"The Narcos Connection" (art by Andrew Currie, #52-55)
"Doomsday" (art by Colin Wilson and Mike Collins, #56-59)

Epilogues

"Volt Face" (art by Colin Wilson, 2000 AD #1167, 1999)
Circumstances of Volt's death fabricated. This was DeMarco's last appearance in any Judge Dredd strip until 2012 (although she had since appeared in The Simping Detective and in her own series).
"Short Circuit" (art by Colin Wilson, Judge Dredd Megazine #61, 2000)
Judge White, suffering from post-traumatic stress, has a psychotic breakdown and goes on a rampage.
"The Cal Legacy" (art by Colin Wilson, 2000 AD #1178-1179, 2000)
Hershey becomes chief judge and demotes Edgar.

Collected editions

"The Doomsday Scenario" was collected into two trade paperbacks in 2001:
Judge Dredd: Doomsday for Dredd (Hamlyn, 2001)
Collecting 2000 AD stories (#1141-1164)
Judge Dredd: Doomsday for Mega-City One (Hamlyn, 2001)
Collecting Megazine stories (#52-59), plus "Volt Face" (2000 AD #1167)

The same stories, except "Volt Face", were reprinted in Judge Dredd: The Complete Case Files volume 30 in November 2017. "Volt Face" was reprinted in volume 31 in April 2018.

All of the stories listed above, except "Short Circuit" and "The Cal Legacy", were reprinted in issues 16 and 37 of Judge Dredd: The Mega Collection (2015 and 2016).

See also
For the First Robot War, see The Robot Wars.

References